Events from the year 1904 in the United States.

Incumbents

Federal Government 
 President: Theodore Roosevelt (R-New York)
 Vice President: vacant
 Chief Justice: Melville Fuller (Illinois)
 Speaker of the House of Representatives: Joseph Gurney Cannon (R–Illinois)
 Congress: 58th

Events

January–March
 January 2 – The first large-scale bodybuilding competition in America concludes at Madison Square Garden in New York City.
 January 8 – The Blackstone Library is dedicated, marking the beginning of the Chicago Public Library system.
 February 7 – The Great Baltimore Fire in Baltimore, Maryland destroys over 1,500 buildings in 30 hours.
 February 23 – For $10 million, the United States gains control of the Panama Canal Zone.

April–June
 April 6 – Joseph F. Smith announces the Second Manifesto in General Conference of the Church of Jesus Christ of Latter-day Saints in Utah Territory, prohibiting the practice of polygamy, which has continued to be sanctioned by some of its leaders in violation of the 1890 Manifesto officially banning the practice.
 April 8 – Longacre Square in Midtown Manhattan is renamed Times Square after The New York Times.
 April 30 – The Louisiana Purchase Exposition World's Fair opens in St. Louis, Missouri (closes December 1).
 May 4 – U.S. Army engineers begin work on the Panama Canal.
 May 5 – Pitching against the Philadelphia Athletics, Cy Young of the Boston Americans throws the first perfect game in the modern era of baseball.
 May 30 – Alpha Gamma Delta sorority is founded at Syracuse University in Syracuse, New York.
 June 15 – A fire aboard the steamboat General Slocum in New York City's East River kills 1,021.

July–September
 July 1 – The third Modern Olympic Games opens in St. Louis, Missouri.
 July 23 – In St. Louis, Missouri, the ice cream cone is invented during the Louisiana Purchase Exposition.
 August 7 – Eden train wreck in Colorado: a bridge is washed away by a flash flood as a train crosses, resulting in at least 88 deaths.
 September – Stuyvesant High School opens in New York City as Manhattan's first manual trade school for boys.
 September 24 – New Market train wreck in Tennessee: two trains collide head-on at speed, resulting in at least 56 deaths.

October–December
 October – The Daytona Educational and Industrial Training School for Negro Girls, predecessor of Bethune–Cookman University, is opened in Florida by Mary McLeod Bethune.
 October 1 – Phi Delta Epsilon, the international medical fraternity, is founded by Aaron Brown and eight of his friends at Cornell University Medical College.
 October 5 – Alpha Kappa Psi, the co-ed Professional Business fraternity, is founded on the campus of New York University
 October 15 – Theta Tau, the Professional Engineering Fraternity, is founded at the University of Minnesota in Minneapolis, Minnesota.
 October 17 – Amadeo Giannini founds the Bank of Italy in San Francisco, predecessor of the Bank of America.
 October 19 – Polytechnic University of the Philippines is founded as Manila Business School through the superintendence of the American Gabriel A. O'Reilly.
 October 27 – The first underground line of the New York City Subway opens.
 November 8 – U.S. presidential election, 1904: Republican incumbent Theodore Roosevelt defeats Democrat Alton B. Parker.
 November 23 – The Olympic Games end.
 November 24 – A continuous track tractor is successfully demonstrated by the Holt Manufacturing Company.
 December 10 – The Pi Kappa Phi fraternity is founded at the College of Charleston in South Carolina.  
 December 30 – The East Boston Tunnel opens, for streetcars.
 December 31 – In New York City, the first New Year's Eve celebration is held in Times Square.

Undated
 St. Bernard's School is founded in New York City on Manhattan.

Ongoing
 Progressive Era (1890s–1920s)
 Lochner era (c. 1897–c. 1937)
 Black Patch Tobacco Wars (1904–1909)

Births 
 January 5 – Jeane Dixon, astrologer (died 1997)
 January 10 – Ray Bolger, actor, singer and dancer, best known for his role in The Wizard of Oz (died 1987)
 January 19 – Leo Soileau, Cajun musician (died 1980)
 January 21 – Edris Rice-Wray Carson, medical researcher (died 1990)
 January 26 – Ancel Keys, nutritionist (died 2004)
 February 3 – Pretty Boy Floyd, bank robber (shot 1934)
 February 16 – George F. Kennan, political adviser (died 2005)
 March 1
 Paul Hartman, actor and dancer (died 1973)
 Glenn Miller, bandleader (died 1944)
 March 2 – Dr. Seuss, children's author (The Cat in the Hat) (died 1991)
 March 20
 Frank Mills, politician in Ohio legislature (died 1969)
 B. F. Skinner, behavioral psychologist (died 1990)
 March 23 (possible year) – Joan Crawford, actress (died 1977)
 March 26 – Joseph Campbell, author on mythology (died 1987)
 April 12 – Glen H. Taylor, U.S. Senator from Idaho from 1945 to 1951 (died 1984)
 April 18 – Pigmeat Markham, African American entertainer (died 1981)
 April 20 – Bob Bartlett, U.S. Senator from Alaska from 1959 to 1968 (died 1968)
 April 22 – J. Robert Oppenheimer, physicist (died 1967)
 May 17 – John J. Williams, U.S. Senator from Delaware from 1947 to 1970 (died 1988)
 May 21
 Robert Montgomery, actor and director (died 1981)
 Fats Waller, African American jazz pianist and entertainer (died 1943)
 June 2 – Johnny Weissmuller, swimmer and actor (Tarzan) (died 1984)
 June 3 – Charles R. Drew, African American physician, pioneer in blood transfusion (died 1950)
 June 24 – Phil Harris, bandleader and comic actor (died 1995)
 July 1 – Mary Calderone, physician and public health advocate (died 1998)
 July 15 – Dorothy Fields, librettist (died 1974)
 August 16 – Wendell Meredith Stanley, chemist, recipient of the Nobel Prize in Chemistry in 1946 (died 1971)
 August 17 – Mary Cain, newspaper editor and politician (died 1984)
 August 21 – Count Basie, African American jazz bandleader (died 1984)
 September 12 – Lou Moore, race car driver and team owner (died 1956)
 October 3 – Charles J. Pedersen, chemist, recipient of the Nobel Prize in Chemistry in 1987 (died 1989)
 November 1 – Laura La Plante, silent film actress (died 1996)
 November 17 – Isamu Noguchi, sculptor (died 1988)
 November 25 – Lillian Copeland, Olympic field athlete (died 1964)
 December 7 – Clarence Nash, voice actor (died 1985)
 December 18 – George Stevens, film director (died 1975)
 December 25 – Flemmie Pansy Kittrell, nutritionist (died 1980)
 December 30 – David M. Shoup, general (died 1983)

Deaths
 January 2 – James Longstreet, one of the foremost Confederate generals of the American Civil War (born 1821)
 January 6 – Julia Anna Orum, educator, lecturer, and author (born 1843
 January 9 – John Brown Gordon, U.S. Senator from Georgia from 1873 to 1880 and from 1891 to 1897 (born 1832)
 January 20 – Maria Louisa Bustill, schoolteacher, mother of Paul Robeson (born 1853)
 February 9 – Mary Abbott, golfer (born 1857)
 February 15 – Mark Hanna, U.S. Senator from Ohio (born 1837)
 March 17 – William Elbridge Sewell, naval officer and Governor of Guam (born 1851)
 June 5 – Olivia Langdon Clemens, editor (born 1845)
 June 28 – Dan Emmett, founder of the Virginia Minstrels (born 1815)
 July 26 – Henry Clay Taylor, admiral (born 1845)
 August 16 – Colonel Prentiss Ingraham, author of dime fiction (born 1843)
 August 22 – Kate Chopin, fiction writer (born 1850)
 October 11 – Trumbull Stickney, classicist and poet (born 1874)
 December 21 – George L. Shoup, U.S. Senator from Idaho from 1890 to 1901 (born 1836)
 Little Joe Monahan, transgender rancher (born 1850)

See also
 List of American films of 1904
 Timeline of United States history (1900–1929)

References

Further reading
 . (Covers events May 1898-June 1905.)

External links
 

 
1900s in the United States
United States
United States
Years of the 20th century in the United States